The Flag of Punjab is the flag of the Province of Punjab within Pakistan.

Design
The Punjab provincial flag is green and shows the provincial emblem in the centre which reflects Punjab's natural resources like its wheat crop, and the five rivers which give the province its name in Persian (from Punj = Five, Aab = Waters). The inscription below in a crescent scroll reads Government of Punjab in Shahmukhi alphabets of Punjabi. The flag uses the Pakistani national colours, white and dark green, colors that reflect the Islamic heritage of Pakistan.

Historical emblems
During the British Raj, the undivided province of Punjab was granted a coat of arms. These arms consisted of a purple shield charged with a sun rising over five rivers in silver. The motto translated as "Let it grow from the rivers"  The name "Punjab" means land of five rivers.

See also
 Government of Punjab, Pakistan
 Flag of Pakistan (Federal)
 List of Pakistani flags

References 

Flags of Pakistan
Flags of country subdivisions
Flags introduced in 1970